Equestrian statue of George Meade may refer to

 Equestrian statue of George Meade (Philadelphia)
 Equestrian statue of Georgia Meade at Gettysburg National Military Park